Nyavani is a small village situated along the R81 route to Punda Maria in the Kruger National Park. The nearest towns from Nyavani are Malamulele and Thohoyandou. Nyavani falls under Collins Chabane Local Municipality. It borders the villages Tshikonelo to the north and Murhaga to the west.

The two dominant languages spoken in the area are Venda and Tsonga. There are two schools in Nyavani: Dlamani High School and Nyavani Primary School.

References

Populated places in the Thulamela Local Municipality